The Breadfield is a region in southwest Transylvania, Romania between Orăștie (Szászváros) and Sebeș (Szászsebes) in the Transylvanian Saxon land, near the Mureș River. The central settlement is Cugir.

The Cugir River's old Magyar name is Kenyér (bread), which gave rise to the name Breadfield. The region's borders to the south are the Cugir Mountains, to the north the Mureș River, to the west Hunedoara County, and to the east the Sebeș River.

The area is a fertile plain. Formerly, Breadfield's population was largely Saxons, but today it is chiefly Romanians. In 1479 the Hungarians scored a victory over the Ottoman Army in the Battle of Breadfield,  near Șibot. In remembrance of the victory, Stephen V Báthory built a chapel.

Settlements of Breadfield
 Vințu de Jos (hung. Alvinc, ger. Unterwintz or Winzendorf)
 Pianul de Jos (hung. Alsópián, Szászpián, Romanian Chian, ger. Deutschpien or Deutschpian)
 Săliștea (hung. Tartaria, later Alsótatárlaka, in 1310 Oláhárkos and Szászárkos or -erkes, in 1488 Grebencsin)
 Săliștea (a different town from the above-mentioned settlement; sometime Cioara, hung. Alsócsóra)
 Balomiru de Câmp (hung. Balomir)
 Șibot (hung. Alkenyér or Zsibotalkenyér, ger. Unterbrodsdorf)
 Vinerea (hung. Felkenyér, ger. Oberbrodsdorf)
 Cugir
 Aurel Vlaicu (previously Binținți, hung. Bencenc, ger. Benzendorf; the location of the Breadfield Battle)
 Pișchinți (hung. Piskinc)
 Vaidei (hung. Vajdej, ger. Weidendorf)
 Romos (hung. Romosz, ger. Rumes)
 Gelmar (hung. Gyalmár)

See also 
 Battle of Breadfield
 The Holocaust in Hungary: Nazis cheated Hungarian Jews into believing they would be only resettled in Kenyérmező (see Rezső Kasztner)

External links 
 Reminiscences of the Breadfield
 Small lexicon - Breadfield 
 Hungarian Ethnical Lexicon 

Geography of Transylvania